The Permanent European Conference for the Study of the Rural Landscape (PECSRL) is an international network of landscape researchers whose interest focus on the past, present and future of European landscapes, and serves as an international platform for new initiatives, meetings and publications about European rural landscapes. It meets every two years in a different European country for lectures, discussions, working groups and landscape excursions. It has several working groups that focus on actual problems in European landscape management and landscape research. The unifying concept of PECSRL is the past, present and future of European landscapes, relating to landscape research as well as landscape policy and landscape management.

Objectives
The objectives of PECSRL are:
 to facilitate personal contacts and information exchange between European landscape researchers;
 to improve interdisciplinary cooperation between landscape researchers from various scientific and human landscape disciplines;
 to improve cooperation between landscape researchers and landscape managers;
 to function as a platform for new initiatives in European landscape research and landscape management.

History and scope
The Permanent European Conference for the Study of the Rural Landscape is one of the most stable European networks of landscape researchers. It was established in 1957 at an inaugural conference held in Nancy, France. Initially, it consisted mainly of (historical) geographers, but during the last few decades its membership has diversified to include ecologists, social scientists, rural planners, landscape architects, historians, archaeologists, landscape managers, as well as other scholars and practitioners interested in European landscapes. Members undertake both fundamental and applied research on all aspects of the rural landscape or have a position in landscape management or heritage management. PECSRL covers Pan-Europe which means that it connects researchers from Northern, Eastern, Southern, Central and Western Europe. All together more than thirty European countries take part in PECSRL.

Conferences
 28th Session: "European Landscapes for Quality of Life?", 2018, Clermont-Ferrand and Mende (France)
 27th Session: "Mountains, uplands, lowlands. European landscapes from an altitudinal perspective", 2016, Innsbruck and Seefeld (Austria)
 26th Session: "Unraveling the Logics of Landscape", 2014, Gothenburg and Mariestad (Sweden)
 25th Session: "Reflection on landscape change: the European perspective", 2012, Leeuwarden and Terschelling (the Netherlands)
 24th Session: "Living in Landscapes: Knowledge, Practice, Imagination", 2010, Riga and Liepaja (Latvia)
 23rd Session: "Landscapes, identities and development", 2008, Lisbon and Óbidos (Portugal)
 22nd Session: "European rural future“: Landscape as an interface", 2006, Berlin and Schloss Hubertusstock (Germany)
 21st Session: "One region, many stories - Mediterranean landscapes in a changing Europe", 2004, Limnos and Lesvos (Greece)
 20th Session: "Rural landscapes: past processes - future strategies", 2002, Tartu and Otepää (Estonia)
 19th Session: "European landscapes, from mountain to sea", 2000, London and Aberystwyth (United Kingdom)
 18th Session: "Shaping the land", 1998, Røros and Trondheim (Norway)
 17th Session, 1996, Dublin (Ireland)
 16th Session: "Rural landscape between State and Local Communities", 1994, Torino (Italy)
 15th Session: "L'avenir des paysages ruraix européens", 1992, Lyon (France)
 14th Session: "The transformation of the European rural landscape", 1990, Baarn and Ghent (The Netherlands / Belgium)
 13th Session, 1987, Stockholm (Sweden)
 12th Session, 1985, Rastede and Hagen (Federal Republic of Germany)
 11th Session, 1981, Durham and Cambridge (England)
 10th Session, 1979, Roskilde (Denmark)
 9th Session, 1977, Rennes and Quimper (France)
 8th Session, 1975, Warsaw (Poland)
 7th Session, 1973, Perugia (Italy)
 6th Session, 1971, Belfast (Northern Ireland)
 5th Session, 1969, Liège (Belgium)
 4th Session, 1966, Würzburg (Federal Republic of Germany)
 3rd Session, 1964, Birmingham (England)
 2nd Session, 1960, Vadstena (Sweden)
 1st Session, 1957, Nancy (France)

See also
Landscape
Cultural landscape
Landscape planning
European Landscape Convention

Further reading
Baker, Alan R.H. (1988) Historical Geography and the Study of the European Rural Landscape. Geografiska Annaler 70B (1) 5-16.
Helmfrid, Staffan (2004)  The Permanent European Conference and the Study of the Rural Landscape. In Palang, Hannes (red.) (2004). European rural landscapes: persistence and change in a globalising environment. Boston: Kluwer Academic Publishers, p. 467 -

External links
 Permanent European Conference for the Study of the Rural Landscape (PECSRL)

Landscape
Geography organizations
Academic conferences